Evergreen Park Elementary School District 124 is a school district headquartered in Evergreen Park, Illinois, in the Chicago metropolitan area. It serves grades K-8. Students move on to the Evergreen Park Community High School District 231, which operates Evergreen Park High School.

Schools
Northeast Elementary School
Northwest Elementary School
Southeast Elementary School
Southwest Elementary School
Central Junior High School

External links

References

School districts in Cook County, Illinois
Evergreen Park, Illinois